The Anglican Diocese of Oyo is one of 19 within the Anglican Province of Ibadan, itself one of 14 provinces within the Church of Nigeria. The Bishop Emeritus is Jacob Ola Fasipe; and the current bishop is Williams Oluwarotimi Aladekugbe, who was elected on 9 August 2014.

Notes

Church of Nigeria dioceses
Dioceses of the Province of Ibadan